Afrimines Resources is a company based in the Democratic Republic of the Congo that has precious metal mining rights in various deposits. One is a  area within the Kilo Moto area of the northeastern provinces of  Haut-Uélé and Ituri.
The company was established in 2003.

Afrimines would hold 20% and Katanga Minerals Holdings would hold 20%. Development costs were to be 90% covered by Tiger Resources and 10% by Afrimines.

On 1 December 2010 the Australian Erongo Energy announced it had agreed to purchase a 70% interest from Afrimines Resources in a group of nine tenements covering  in the Maniema Province.
The tenements are in the same geological zone as Banro Corporation's gold mines.
In April 2011 Regal Resources of Australia announced that it had acquired a 70% interest from Afrimines in a  group of gold-bearing properties in South Kivu. The properties were located between two gold discoveries by Banro Corporation.
The properties had extensive alluvial workings by artisanal miners.

References

Copper mining companies of the Democratic Republic of the Congo
2003 establishments in the Democratic Republic of the Congo
Haut-Uélé